The Persian Version is a 2023 American comedy-drama film directed and written by Maryam Keshavarz. The film won two awards, including the Audience Award for U.S. Dramatic Competition, at the Sundance Film Festival.

Premise
While her father recovers from a heart transplant, a young Iranian-American filmmaker clashes with her mother and learns of a family secret.

Cast
Layla Mohammadi as Leila
Niousha Noor as Shirin
Kamand Shafieisabet as young Shirin
Bijan Daneshmand as Ali Reza
Bella Warda as Mamanjoon
Chiara Stella
Shervin Alenabi as young Ali Reza
Jerry Habibi as Abbas
Samuel Tehrani as Shivaz
Andrew Malik as Eman

Release
The Persian Version had its world premiere at the Sundance Film Festival on January 21, 2023. It received standing ovation from the audience. Shortly after, Sony Pictures Classics acquired distribution rights to the film.

Reception
On the review aggregator website Rotten Tomatoes, 88% of 25 critics' reviews are positive, with an average rating of 6.1/10. Metacritic, which uses a weighted average, assigned the film a score of 65 out of 100, based on five critics, indicating "generally favorable reviews".

Nick Allen of RogerEbert.com called the film "an ebullient rule-breaker" and said it was "one of the most entertaining and moving experiences I've had at Sundance this year."

Accolades

References

External links

2020s English-language films
2020s Persian-language films
2023 comedy-drama films
2023 independent films
American LGBT-related films
American multilingual films
Films about families
Comedy-drama films about Asian Americans
Iranian-American films
2023 LGBT-related films
LGBT-related comedy-drama films
American comedy-drama films
Sundance Film Festival award winners
Stage 6 Films films
Sony Pictures Classics films